Antonia may refer to:

People
 Antonia (name), including a list of people with the name
 Antonia gens, a Roman family, any woman of the gens was named Antonia
 Antônia (footballer)
 Antônia Melo

Entertainment
 Antonia's Line, originally Antonia, a 1995 Dutch drama
 Antonia (1935 film), a French musical comedy film
 Antônia (film), a 2006 Brazilian musical drama
 Antonia: A Portrait of the Woman, a 1974 documentary
 Antonia, a Mad TV recurring character
 "Antonia", a song by Motion City Soundtrack on the album Even If It Kills Me
 "Antonia", a song by Pat Metheny on the album Secret Story
 "Antonia", a love interest of James T. Kirk in Star Trek Generations
Antonia, an 1863 novel by George Sand

Places
 Antonia, Masovian Voivodeship, east-central Poland
 Antonia, Warmian-Masurian Voivodeship, north Poland
 Antonia, Missouri, a community in the United States
 Antonia Fortress, Jerusalem
 Pico de Antónia, Cape Verde
 Antonia (Port Allen, Louisiana), a historic plantation

Biology
 Antonia (plant), a genus in the Loganiaceae family
 Antonia (fly), a genus of flies in the family Bombyliidae
  Antopedaliodes antonia, a butterfly species in the genus Antopedaliodes and the tribe Satyrini
 Elachista antonia, a moth species in the genus Elachista

Other uses
 RMS Antonia, a 1921 ocean liner
 272 Antonia, an asteroid
 British Rail Class 40 diesel locomotive D214, built by English Electric at Newton-le-Willows, Lancashire

See also

Antonya Nelson
 My Ántonia, a 1918 novel by Willa Cather